Phytoecia cylindricollis is a species of beetle in the family Cerambycidae. It was described by Hermann Julius Kolbe in 1893, originally under the genus Blepisanis. It is known from the Ivory Coast, the Democratic Republic of the Congo, Ghana, Guinea, Benin, Gabon, and Togo.

Subspecies
 Phytoecia cylindricollis subternigra Breuning, 1950
 Phytoecia cylindricollis cylindricollis (Kolbe, 1893)

References

Phytoecia
Beetles described in 1893
Taxa named by Hermann Julius Kolbe